Paul A. Longley is a British geographer. He is Professor of Geographic Information Science (GISci) at University College London (UCL), UK, where he also directs the ESRC Consumer Data Research Centre. Prior to joining UCL in July 2000, he was the Professor of Geography at the University of Bristol.

His research interests are developed around socioeconomic applications of GIScience, and have included projects based on topics such as: geo-temporal demographics and social media usage, fractal analysis of cities, geo-genealogy of family names, retail geography analytics and the effectiveness of public service delivery (specifically health, education and policing). His publications include 18 books and over 150 contributions to refereed journal articles, edited collections and book chapters. He is past Editor-in-Chief of the academic journal Computers, Environment and Urban Systems and a past co-editor of Environment and Planning B.

He teaches Geographic Information Science and Systems and is a co-author of the best-selling book of that name. He has been involved in the postgraduate supervision of over 50 Ph.D. students. He is a regular contributor to internationally conferences and has held eleven externally funded visiting appointments, and has many extensive teaching commitments.

In 2013 he was awarded the Royal Geographical Society Victoria Medal.

Appointments 
 2000–Present - Professor of Geographic Information Science, University College London (2003-4 - seconded to ESRC Advanced Institute for Management Research Senior Fellowship)
 1996-2000 - Professor of Geography, University of Bristol
 1994-96 - Reader in Geography, University of Bristol (including a period as an ESRC Research Fellow, 1994–95)
 1992-94 - Lecturer in Geography, University of Bristol
 1984-92 - Lecturer in Planning, Cardiff University (UWIST prior to 1/9/88)
 1983 84 Lecturer in Geography, University of Reading

Education & Qualifications 
 1997 - D.Sc., University of Bristol
 1984 - Ph.D. (Urban Geography), University of Bristol
 1980 - B.Sc. First Class Honours (Geography), University of Bristol

Special Awards, Honours & Distinctions 
 2013 - Royal Geographical Society Victoria Medal
 2010 - Visiting Professor, University of Tokyo
 2008 - Visiting Professor, University College Dublin
 2007, 2009, 2011, 2013 - Visiting Professor, Ritsumeikan University, Japan
 2002 - Registered Practitioner, the Higher Education Academy (previously the ILTHE)
 2002 - Elected Academician, Academy of Social Sciences (Academy of Learned Societies for the Social Sciences prior to 2007)
 1980 - University of Bristol Miller Barstow Prize for best undergraduate social science dissertation
 1980 - Walter Scheel Scholarship

References

External links
 Official website

1959 births
British geographers
Living people
Fellows of the Academy of Social Sciences
Alumni of the University of Bristol
Academics of the University of Bristol
Academics of University College London
Geographic information scientists
Victoria Medal recipients